Americus is an unincorporated community in Chaffee County, Colorado, United States.

Geography
Americus is located at  (38.9024951,-106.1655744).

References

Unincorporated communities in Chaffee County, Colorado
Unincorporated communities in Colorado